Sandro Salvadore (29 November 1939 – 4 January 2007) was an Italian footballer who played as a defender for Italian clubs A.C. Milan and Juventus throughout his career, winning titles at both clubs. He also represented the Italy national team, participating in the 1960 Summer Olympics, and two FIFA World Cups, and was also a member of the team that won the 1968 UEFA European Football Championship.

International career
From 1960 to 1970 Salvadore won 36 full caps for Italy at international level. He was part of the teams that played both at the 1962 and 1966 FIFA World Cups (the latter as captain).

Style of play
Salvadore usually played as a libero, although he was also capable of playing in other defensive positions, including as a centre-back. He is considered to be one of the greatest Italian defenders of all time.

Honours
Milan
Serie A: 1958–59, 1961–62

Juventus
Serie A: 1966–67, 1971–72
Coppa Italia: 1964–65

Italy
UEFA European Championships: 1968

References

External links

1939 births
2007 deaths
Footballers from Milan
Italian footballers
Italy international footballers
1962 FIFA World Cup players
1966 FIFA World Cup players
UEFA Euro 1968 players
UEFA European Championship-winning players
A.C. Milan players
Juventus F.C. players
Serie A players
Footballers at the 1960 Summer Olympics
Olympic footballers of Italy
Association football defenders